The ice hockey team rosters at the 1998 Winter Olympics for the women's tournament consisted of the following players:

Canada
Becky Kellar, Cassie Campbell, Danielle Goyette, Fiona Smith, France St. Louis, Geraldine Heaney, Hayley Wickenheiser, Jayna Hefford, Jennifer Botterill, Judy Diduck, Karen Nystrom, Kathy McCormack, Laura Schuler, Lesley Reddon (G), Lori Dupuis, Manon Rhéaume (G), Nancy Drolet, Stacy Wilson (C), Thérèse Brisson (A), Vicky Sunohara

China
Chen Jing, Dang Hong, Diao Ying, Gong Ming, Guo Hong, Guo Lili, Guo Wei, Huo Lina, Li Xuan, Liu Chunhua, Liu Hongmei, Lu Yan, Ma Jinping, Ma Xiaojun, Sang Hong, Wang Wei, Xu Lei, Yang Xiuqing, Zhang Jing, Zhang Lan

Finland
Emma Laaksonen-Terho, Riikka Nieminen-Välilä (A), Johanna Ikonen, Karoliina Rantamäki, Katja Riipi, Katja Lehto, Kirsi Hänninen (A), Liisa-Maria Sneck (G), Maria Selin, Marianne Ihalainen (C), Marika Lehtimäki, Marja-Helena Pälvilä, Päivi Salo, Petra Vaarakallio, Sanna Lankosaari, Sari Fisk, Sari Krooks, Satu Huotari, Tiia Reima, Tuula Puputti (G)

Japan
Miharu Araki, Shiho Fujiwara, Akiko Hatanaka, Mitsuko Igarashi, Yoko Kondo, Akiko Naka, Maiko Obikawa, Yuka Oda, Yukari Ohno, Chie Sakuma, Ayumi Sato, Masako Sato, Rie Sato, Satomi Ono, Yukio Satomi, Aki Sudo, Yuki Togawa, Aki Tsuchida, Haruka Watanabe, Naho Yoshimi

Sweden
Annica Åhlén, Lotta Almblad, Gunilla Andersson, Kristina Bergstrand, Pernilla Burholm, Susanne Ceder, Ann-Louise Edstrand, Joa Elfsberg, Åsa Elfving, Anne Ferm, Charlotte Göthesson, Linda Gustafsson, Malin Gustafsson, Erika Holst, Åsa Lidström, Ylva Lindberg, Tina Månsson, Pia Morelius, Maria Rooth, Therese Sjölander

United States
Alana Blahoski, A. J. Mleczko, Angela Ruggiero, Cammi Granato (C), Chris Bailey, Colleen Coyne, Lisa Brown-Miller, Gretchen Ulion, Jenny Schmidgall, Karyn Bye (A), Katie King, Laurie Baker, Tricia Dunn, Sandra Whyte, Sara DeCosta (G), Sarah Tueting (G), Shelley Looney, Sue Merz, Tara Mounsey, Vicki Movsessian

References

rosters
1998